The Chronicle of Ireland is the modern name for a hypothesized collection of ecclesiastical annals recording events in Ireland from 432 to 911 AD.

Several surviving annals share events in the same sequence and wording, until 911 when they continue separate narratives. They include the Annals of Inisfallen, the Annals of Ulster, the Chronicon Scotorum, the Annals of Clonmacnoise, the Annals of Tigernach, the Annals of Roscrea, the Annals of Boyle, and the Fragmentary Annals of Ireland. "The Chronicle of Ireland" represents the scholarly consensus solution to this Gaelic synoptic problem.

Format 

Events are listed in separate entries under the heading of a single year.  Most entries consist of only one or two sentences, and some years contain only one or two entries. The Viking raid on Iona Abbey in 806, in which the entire population of the abbey was massacred, is recorded with typical brevity:

Authorship 

There is no direct evidence for the identity of the Chronicle's successive authors, but scholars are confident that it was produced by annalists working in churches and monasteries and was intended for an ecclesiastical audience.  The version of the Chronicle that annalists and chroniclers were working from was written in different places at different times; the earliest evidence for one of its authors places it in Iona sometime after 563, continuing until about 642. Around 639, another chronicle of uncertain origin was begun elsewhere and merged with the Iona chronicle in the second half of the 7th century.  The chronicle was then continued until about 740.  From about 740 to 911, the Chronicle's annalist was working in the Irish midlands, probably in the  province of Brega (sometimes Breagh) but possibly in the monastery at Clonard.  Some scholars believe that work may have moved to Armagh by the beginning of the 9th century, but debate continues on this point.

After 911, the Chronicle's descendants break into two main branches: one in Armagh, which was integrated into the Annals of Ulster; and a "Clonmacnoise group" including the Annals of Clonmacnoise (an English translation), the Annals of Tigernach (fragmentary), the Chronicum Scotorum (an abbreviation of Tigernach), and the Annals of the Four Masters.  Most surviving witnesses to the lost Chronicle's original content are descended from the Clonmacnoise chronicle.

Content 

A large number of the Chronicle's entries are obituaries. The cause of death was significant to the annalists as an indicator of the death's "spiritual quality"; they felt it indicated whether the deceased would go to Heaven or Hell.

After 800, records of Viking raids (as in the example above) also make up a large number of entries. Other entries include observations of astronomical events, such as a solar eclipse that took place on June 29, 512. Some events outside Ireland also appear in the Chronicle; during some parts of the eighth and ninth centuries, its chronology for certain events in England is more accurate than that of the Anglo-Saxon Chronicle.

Chronological apparatus 

As of the middle 7th century, the Chronicle's dating scheme "consisted of a kalend (Kl) followed, until at least the mid-seventh century, by the ferial of 1 January". This scheme, and much of the Chronicle's witness to world history prior to 400, was based on the chronicle of Rufinus of Aquileia who wrote in the early 5th century.

See also
 Irish annals

References

Sources
 
 
 McCarthy, D. (2005) Irish chronicles and their chronology
 Evans, N. (2010) 'The Present and the Past in Medieval Irish Chronicles', Woodbridge & Rochester, Boydell & Brewer

Irish chronicles
Christianity in medieval Ireland
10th-century history books
Hypothetical documents